Domenico Balestrieri was an Italian painter from Ascoli Piceno. He was active in the 1460s in Urbino, where he painted in the church of San Rocco. He is not to be confused with the seventeenth-century poet, writer, and philosopher from Milan.

References

People from Ascoli Piceno
15th-century Italian painters
Italian male painters
Italian Renaissance painters
Year of death unknown
Year of birth unknown